Amos Aaron Strunk (January 22, 1889 – July 22, 1979) was a center fielder who played in Major League Baseball from 1908 through 1924. A member of four World Series champion teams, Strunk batted and threw left-handed. He was born in Philadelphia.

A dependable and speedy player, both on the basepaths and in the field, Strunk was scouted and signed by Philadelphia Athletics' manager Connie Mack, who did not hesitate to call him "the most underrated outfielder in baseball".

Strunk reached the majors in 1908 with the Athletics, spending nine years with them before moving to the Boston Red Sox (1918–19), and played again for Philadelphia (1919–20) and in parts of four seasons with the Chicago White Sox (1920–23). Then, he returned with the Athletics in 1924, his last major league season. Five times he led American League outfielders in fielding percentage, and played in five World Series with the Athletics (1910–11, 1913–14) and Red Sox (1918).

In a 17-season career, Strunk was a .284 hitter (1418-for-4999) with 15 home runs and 529 RBI in 1512 games played, including 696 runs, 213 doubles, 96 triples  and 185 stolen bases. His career fielding percentage at all three outfield positions and first base was .980.

Following his baseball career, Strunk spent fifty years in the insurance business. He died in Llanerch, Pennsylvania, at the age of 90.

He was the last surviving member of the 1910, 1911 and 1913 World Champion Philadelphia Athletics.

See also

List of Major League Baseball career stolen bases leaders

External links

Retrosheet

Boston Red Sox players
Chicago White Sox players
Philadelphia Athletics players
Major League Baseball center fielders
Shamokin (minor league baseball) players
Milwaukee Brewers (minor league) players
Shamokin Shammies players
1889 births
1979 deaths
Minor league baseball managers
Baseball players from Philadelphia